The Travelcard is an inter-modal travel ticket for unlimited use on the London Underground, London Overground, Elizabeth line, Docklands Light Railway, London Trams, London Buses and National Rail services in the Greater London area. Travelcards can be purchased for a period of time varying from one day to a year, from Transport for London, National Rail and their agents. Depending on where it is purchased, and the length of validity, a Travelcard is either printed on a paper ticket with a magnetic stripe or encoded onto an Oyster card, Transport for London's contactless electronic smart card. The cost of a Travelcard is determined by the area it covers and, for this purpose, London is divided into a number of fare zones. The Travelcard season ticket for unlimited travel on London Buses and the London Underground was launched on 22 May 1983 by London Transport. One Day Travelcards and validity on other transport modes were added from 1984 onwards. The introduction of the Travelcard caused an increase in patronage and reduced the number of tickets that needed to be purchased by passengers.

History

Before the introduction of the Travelcard, tickets for the London Underground were purchased on a 'point-to-point' basis between two stations, either as a single, return or season ticket; and were priced according to distance travelled. Tickets for travel on London Buses and British Rail were purchased separately. The Travelcard was introduced as the third in a series of major fare revisions that had started in 1981. The introduction of the Travelcard was intended to increase patronage on London Underground and London Buses, particularly during less busy times and to speed up the boarding of bus services.

On 4 October 1981, following the Greater London Council election, the incoming Labour administration simplified fares in Greater London by introducing four new bus fare zones and two central London Underground zones, named City and West End, where flat fares applied for the first time. This was accompanied by a cut in prices of about a third and was marketed as the Fares Fair campaign. Following successful legal action against it, on 21 March 1982 London Bus fares were doubled and London Underground fares increased by 91%. The two central area zones were retained and the fares to all other stations were restructured to be graduated at three-mile intervals; and thus grouping those stations within three miles of the central zones in an 'inner zone'.

In 1983, a third revision of fares was undertaken, and a new inter-modal Travelcard season ticket was launched covering five new numbered zones; representing an overall cut in prices of around 25%. The One Day Travelcard was launched in 1984 and on weekdays was only sold for travel after 09.30. In January 1985 the Capitalcard season ticket was launched, offering validity on British Rail services as well as London Underground and London Buses. It was priced around 10-15% higher than the Travelcard. The card was marketed under the brand "The London Connection", illustrated with an image of an electric plug bringing together the corporate identities of British Rail and London Transport. In June 1986 the One Day Capitalcard was launched. The Capitalcard brand ended in January 1989 when the Travelcard gained validity on British Rail and DLR services. In January 1991 Zone 5 was split to create a new Zone 6.

In January 2002 a peak version of the One Day Travelcard was introduced on weekdays, which allows travel between 04:30 and 09:30 and in 2005 a 3-day version of the Travelcard was launched (they were discontinued in 2010). Travelcard season tickets were made available on electronic smart cards, known as Oyster cards, from 2003 and by 2005 Transport for London ceased selling season tickets on paper tickets, although they continue to be available from National Rail stations.
The sale of season Travelcards on paper at National Rail stations ended on 1 June 2022.

Operation

Usage 
A Travelcard entitles the holder to unlimited travel in Greater London on London Buses, London Trams, London Underground, London Overground, Docklands Light Railway and National Rail services. They provide travel within up to 9 numbered concentric zones, with Zone 1 (which includes the central areas of The City and the West End) at the middle and zones 6, 7, 8 and 9 (which includes London Heathrow Airport and outlying suburbs such as Uxbridge and Upminster, as well as places outside London such as Amersham) at the outer edge. On the London Underground, London Overground, DLR and National Rail, the Travelcard is only valid within the zones indicated on the ticket. On London Buses any Travelcard, regardless of the zones, can be used on any route. On Tramlink any Travelcard valid in zones 3, 4, 5, or 6 can be used on any tram route. Travelcards are sold in a limited number of combinations of adjacent zones with different combinations available depending on the length of validity. Travelcards for only one zone are no longer sold, having been withdrawn in 2006. Travelcards valid for travel in Zone 1 (most of central London) are more expensive than those excluding it, although as of 2011 one-day travelcards not including Zone 1 are no longer sold.

Travelcards are issued for periods of one day or seven days, or for any period from one month to one year, known as a season Travelcard. One day Travelcards can be purchased in Anytime and Off-Peak variants. Anytime Travelcard and Off-peak Travelcard. An Anytime Travelcard may be used from 00:01 on the date of validity and an Off-peak Travelcard may be used from 09:30 on Monday to Friday, and whole day on weekends and public holidays, with both expire at 04:29 the following day.

Travelcards for seven days or longer are known as season tickets and allow travel at any time of the day. When bought at a London Underground station or other Transport for London agent, one day Travelcards are sold on a paper ticket with a magnetic stripe and Travelcards lasting seven days or more are loaded on to an Oyster Card. A monthly travelcard (valid for between 28 and 31 days depending on month) is sold for 3.84 times the price of a 7-day card, while annual travelcards are sold for the price of 40 7-day tickets. The price of a travelcard valid for between one month and one year will be the sum of the relevant number of months, plus a pro-rata monthly rate for the number of days in the final month. As 40 weekly tickets cost approximately the same as a 10-month-12-day ticket, it is not possible in practice to buy a travelcard for a period between 10M12D and 1 year, as an annual pass is cheaper and will be issued anyway.

Currently, Anytime Travelcard is only sold for zones 1-4, 1-6 or 1-9, while off-peak Travelcard is only sold for zones 1-6 or 1-9. Travelcard season tickets are sold for any consecutive zone combinations including at least 2 consecutive zones within 1-6, with tickets including zone 1 significantly more expensive, while season tickets for the outer zones are offered in the combinations 1-7, 1-8, 1-9, 1-9+Watford Junction, 2-7, 2-9+Watford Junction, 4-7 and 4-9+Watford Junction only.

Sale 
A Day Travelcard, only sold as a paper ticket, can be bought at the following places:
 at ticket machines at London Underground / DLR stations, TfL Visitor Centres, or Tramlink shop in Croydon.
 at ticket offices at National Rail stations, or bought from National Rail ticket retailers and collected at National Rail ticket machines / ticket offices.

A Travelcard season ticket is currently sold on smart cards only, which include Oyster card and National Rail ITSO smart cards:
 A Travelcard season ticket can be loaded into an Oyster card at ticket machines at London Underground / DLR stations, TfL Visitor Centres, Oyster ticket shops, or bought online.
 A Travelcard season ticket can be sold by National Rail retailers and loaded into National Rail smart card products.
 A 7 day Travelcard can also be bought online from TfL Visitor Shop, and mailed as a paper ticket. Unlike a 7-day Travelcard season ticket sold by National Rail, this ticket does not require a photocard. This ticket is not sold physically in London, instead, 7-day Travelcards are only sold as an Oyster card at TfL stations and offices.

Only Travelcards sold as National Rail tickets are valid for 2-for-1 offers at attractions in London.

Services outside Greater London

There are various services outside Greater London on which Travelcards can be used. These are six Central line stations in the Epping Forest district of Essex (and two on the boundary) that are included in zones 4, 5 and 6; seven Metropolitan line stations in Hertfordshire and Buckinghamshire that are included in local ancillary zones 7, 8 and 9; four London Overground stations in Hertfordshire, included in local ancillary zones 7 and 8; and fourteen National Rail stations of other operators just outside Greater London that are included in zones 6 to 8. A Travelcard covering the appropriate zones are valid for unlimited travel to/from these stations. Additionally, on some London Buses services that cross the Greater London boundary, Travelcards are valid for the whole route. 

From outside Travelcard zones, outboundary Travelcards can be bought from some stations to a combination of London Zones, including zone 6, as either a day ticket or season ticket. An outboundary day Travelcard can be used to make one outward journey from the origin station to the boundary of zone 6, then one return journey back to the origin on the same day, with unlimited travel allowed within the zones shown on the ticket. Network rail ticket barriers outside zone 6 will retain the day ticket once the return journey has been made even though the travelcard part of the ticket remains valid until 04:30 the following day within the zone 6 boundary. An outboundary Travelcard season ticket can be used for unlimited travel between the origin and destination, and also the within zones specified on the ticket.

Furthermore, Travelcard ticket holders needing to go outside the covered zones can buy a "Boundary Zone" ticket, used in conjunction with the Travelcard. Such tickets are little known and can only be bought from ticket offices but not online, as a result, many travellers, not realising that these tickets can be bought, ended up buying other more expensive tickets for their journeys, resulting in a class action lawsuit against the train companies for a total of £93 million in compensation.

Exceptions
Although located in Zone 6, travel by Heathrow Express from Heathrow Central, Heathrow Terminal 4 or Heathrow Terminal 5 to London Paddington station is not included. 

Travel on the High Speed 1 rail link between London St Pancras and Stratford International is also not included unless the travelcard is "out-boundary": valid to a station outside London. This is because High Speed 1 is considered to be "outside the zones" except for London St Pancras station.

Revenue allocation
The revenues from Travelcard sales are divided according to a scheme agreed by Transport for London and the Rail Delivery Group. A quarterly survey known as the Travelcard Diary Survey is undertaken, where travelcard holders are asked to record all the bus, rail and tube trips they have made using their travelcard.  Both "in-boundary" and "out-boundary" (i.e. Travelcards in or outside the zonal areas) are surveyed, as well as day and monthly, weekly and annual Travelcards. Ensuring that a statistically valid sample that will give a fair and accurate allocation presents a challenge. The average mileage recorded on each mode is then calculated to give allocation factors of the Travelcard revenue to tube, bus and rail.

Additional benefits
Travelcards entitle the holder to a 33% discount on scheduled London River Services and 25% on the London Cable Car. In addition, holders of annual travelcards receive a "gold record card" which offers savings on off-peak travel on the same basis as the National Rail annual gold card.

Travelcards issued on paper tickets at National Rail stations are also treated as 'train tickets' for the Days Out Guide 2-for-1 offers at most attractions participating in the scheme.

See also

Oyster card
Navigo pass similar to Travelcard, used in Île de France
Creditrans similar to Travelcard, used in the Greater Bilbao region.

References

External links

Travelcards and group tickets - at Transport for London

Fare collection systems in London
Transport for London